2nd and King station is a Muni Metro light rail station located in the median of King Street near Second Street in the China Basin neighborhood of San Francisco, California. It is adjacent to Oracle Park. Muni Metro trains use a high-level island platform, while historic streetcars use a pair of side platforms just to the south.

History 

The station opened on January 10, 1998, as part of the Muni Metro Extension project. It was initially served by a temporary E Embarcadero line between Embarcadero station and 4th and King/Caltrain station. N Judah service replaced the shuttle service on August 22, 1998. The adjacent San Francisco Giants baseball stadium (then named Pacific Bell Park) opened in 2000, with 2nd and King station serving as a major transit connection for the stadium and surrounding redevelopment.

T Third Street service began on April 7, 2007; N Judah service was initially cut back to Embarcadero station, with J Church service added at peak hours. On June 30, 2007, the J and N were restored to their previous configuration. E Embarcadero heritage streetcar service was added on August 1, 2015.

T Third Street service was rerouted off King Street and into the Central Subway on January 7, 2023.

References

External links 

SFMTA – King St & 2nd St: northbound, southbound
SF Bay Transit (unofficial): King St & 2nd St

Muni Metro stations
South of Market, San Francisco
Railway stations in the United States opened in 1998
San Francisco Municipal Railway streetcar stations